Achicourt is a commune in the Pas-de-Calais department in northern France.

Geography
A light industrial suburb of Arras located 2 miles (3 km) southwest of Arras, at the D3 and D5 road junction.  The river Crinchon flows through the town.

Population

Sights
 The old windmill, rebuilt in 1994.
 The church of St.Vaast, dating from the twentieth century.
 The church of St.Christophe, dating from the twentieth century.
 Traces of a rectangular castle motte from the thirteenth century.
 The British war cemetery, where 131 English and Canadian soldiers are buried.

See also
Communes of the Pas-de-Calais department

References

External links

 The World War I cemetery
 Official website of the commune

Communes of Pas-de-Calais